Jason Keng-Kwin Chan (born December 1, 1971) is a Malaysian-born Australian actor best known for his role as Cameron Watanabe, the Green Samurai Ranger, as well as his clone, Cyber Cam, in Power Rangers: Ninja Storm.

He is currently a multi-award-winning writer, director, composer and actor based in Singapore. He is co-founder of BananaMana Films, which is one of Singapore's premiere production companies for creating Asian dramas in English for global distribution.

Background & Training 
Born in Kuala Lumpur, Malaysia, Chan is of Chinese descent and moved to Perth, Western Australia with his family when he was only 5 years old. He entered medical school at the University of Western Australia, but Chan continued to pursue the creative arts, studying ballet, contemporary dance, and jazz dance at the Western Australian Academy of Performing Arts. After graduating, he obtained his Fellowship in General Practice and worked as a General Practitioner for a few years before gaining a place in the renowned National Institute of Dramatic Art (NIDA) in Sydney (other graduates include: Mel Gibson, Cate Blanchett, Judy Davis, Baz Luhrmann and Hugo Weaving) where he obtained a Bachelor of Dramatic Arts in Acting. He is the co-founder of the Production Company "BananaMana Films" along with Christian Lee. Chan currently resides in Singapore.

Current Work 
Since co-founding BananaMana Films, Jason has gone on to write, direct, edit and produce for various projects. The first series he co-wrote, directed, produced and acted in was a web series: "What Do Men Want?". However, prior to production the national broadcaster of Singapore asked to have it converted into a full length TV series and it aired in 2014 as a 13 x half hour Romantic comedic TV drama. Jason and Christian won an outstanding directing in a drama series award at LA Webfest for this drama.

Their second drama "Perfect Girl" was created as a 10 x 5-8min web series. This series went on to win 7 international awards from 16 nominations. Jason was credited as writer and composer, and shared directing and editing credits.

Recently, Jason has co-written, directed and scored a TV pilot "Bang Bang Club" which has gone on to win a Platinum REMI award at the Worldfest Houston International Film Festival 2016. Jason was also nominated for Best Editing and Best Original Score for this project at the Indie Series Awards (LA) 2016.

Awards 
Jason has been a recipient of numerous awards and nominations in various categories: writing, directing, acting, editing, composing.

Awards
 Platinum Remi  (Houston International Film Fest 2016)
 Outstanding Writing (LA Webfest 2015)
 Outstanding Directing (LA Webfest 2015)
 Outstanding Editing (LA Webfest 2015)
 Outstanding Drama Series (LA Webfest 2015)
 Outstanding Drama (Toronto Webfest 2015)
 Best International Series (Atlanta Webfest 2014)
Nominations
 Best Editing (Indie Series Awards 2016)
 Best Score (Indie Series Awards 2016)
 Outstanding Lead Actor (LA Webfest 2015)
 Outstanding Cinematography (LA Webfest 2015)
 Triple Threat Auteur (Toronto Webfest 2015)
 Best Overall Series (Toronto Webfest 2015)
 Best Drama (Vancouver Webfest 2015)

Film 
Most recently "Perfect Girl", originally a web series, was picked up as a short feature by global streaming platform VIKI.com. It stars Jason Chan and Khaleila Hisham as the leads and won them both Outstanding Acting nominations and awards in US web series festivals.

His feature film credits include: the animated feature Sing to the Dawn. where he played the villain, and The Leap Years in which he plays the role of "Raymond" alongside Ananda Everingham and Wong Li-Lin. He appeared briefly in Candy, an Australian film, as Heath Ledger's doctor and very briefly in "Stealth" as one of the technicians.

He co-wrote, co-produced and co-directed the 2017 cross-cultural food film Jimami Tofu with Christian Lee, where it world premiered and won the Audience Choice Award at the 37th Hawaii International Film Festival.

Television
In 2014, Jason appeared as co-lead in "What Do Men Want?" - a 13 x half hour romantic drama co-created and directed by himself and his business partner Christian Lee. The drama won them both an Outstanding Directing award at LA Webfest 2016 and aired on national TV in Singapore in 2014.

On graduating from drama school, Chan appeared as host of Disney Channel's Playhouse Disney block which aired throughout Australia. In 2003, he then garnered a role as the Green Samurai Ranger, Cameron Watanabe,  in the American TV series: Power Rangers Ninja Storm.

In Singapore he has appeared in many Mediacorp Channel 5 and Art Central productions including: My Sassy Neighbour, Six Weeks, Parental Guidance, 9 Lives, Mental and The Secret Lives of Sorry Stars.   In Australia he played opposite Jaqueline Macqenzie in Two Twisted.

Jason has also played leads in German telemovies including: "Love in the Lion City",  "The Last Patriarch",  "Love and Death in Java"  and "House of Harmony".

Theatre

In theatre, Jason debuted in the lead role of 'Kevin' in "Connie and Kevin and the Secret Life of Groceries" in Sydney,  then continued in Singapore with ‘Chris’ in Action Theatre's “The Admiral’s Odyssey”, Clifford Bradshaw in Toyfactory's "Cabaret", Lysander in SRT's "A Midsummer Night's Dream", Andy in SRT's "The Office Party", Claudio in SRT's "Much Ado About Nothing" and Marc in The Ensemble Theatre's production of "ART".

References

External links
 http://www.BananaManaFilms.com
 http://www.aadb.com.sg/jason/
 

1971 births
21st-century Australian male actors
Australian expatriates in Singapore
Australian people of Chinese descent
Australian people of Malaysian descent
Living people
Malaysian emigrants to Australia
Malaysian people of Chinese descent
National Institute of Dramatic Art alumni
University of Western Australia alumni
People who lost Malaysian citizenship
Western Australian Academy of Performing Arts alumni